Lively is an unincorporated community in Kaufman County, Texas.

The community derives its name from lively dance socials.

References

Unincorporated communities in Kaufman County, Texas
Unincorporated communities in Texas